CFVR-FM is a Canadian radio station serving Fort McMurray, Alberta, broadcasting at 103.7 FM with a hot adult contemporary format branded on-air as Mix 103.7.

The station is owned & operated by Harvard Media.

History
The station received approval by the CRTC to operate at 103.7 FM in November 2006 and officially launched on January 14, 2008.

References

External links
Mix 103.7
 

FVR
FVR
FVR
Radio stations established in 2008
2008 establishments in Alberta